Komercijalna banka Skopje (abbr. KBS) is a commercial bank with headquarters in Skopje, North Macedonia.

History

It was established in 1955 as Komunalna Banka (business bank for city of Skopje) and it was specialized for approving housing loans and financing construction operations. Since 1955, it has gone through several transformations characteristic for the banking system of the region.

On 1 January 1990, the bank became independent through its transformation into a joint stock company under the name Komercijalna Banka A.D. Skopje.

Today, Komercijalna Banka Skopje is a universal bank licensed for performing all types of banking operations, combining the functions of commercial banking, savings deposits and investments, as well as banking services provided to the citizens and enterprises in the domain of domestic and international payment operations.

References

External links
 

Banks of North Macedonia
Banks established in 1955
Brands of North Macedonia
1955 establishments in the Socialist Republic of Macedonia
Companies based in Skopje